The 1963 NCAA College Division football season was played by American football teams representing 299 colleges and universities recognized the National Collegiate Athletic Association (NCAA) as minor programs.  The remaining 120 colleges and universities that were NCAA members and fielded football teams competed in the 1963 NCAA University Division football season.

Conference standings

Rankings

Small college poll
In 1963, both United Press International (UPI) and the Associated Press (AP) conducted "small college" polls, and selected different number one teams. UPI's panel of coaches selected Delaware, who had a record of 8–0 and had outscored their opponents 290–76 while winning all their games by at least 9 points. The AP's panel of sportswriters selected Northern Illinois, who finished the regular season at 9–0 including three shutouts. The Huskies went on to defeat  in the Mineral Water Bowl, 21–14.

After the season ended, the NCAA announced plans to play "four postseason regional games" in 1964. These were played from 1964 through 1972. However, not until 1973, when the NCAA College Division was reorganized as NCAA Division II and NCAA Division III, did these postseason games to determine a national champion.

Associated Press (writers) final poll
Published on November 29

Denotes team played a game after UPI poll, hence record differs in AP poll
UMass was actually 8–0–1 when the poll was taken.

United Press International (coaches) final poll
Published on December 4

Florida A&M actually 7–2 when the poll was taken.

See also
 1963 NCAA University Division football season
 1963 NAIA football season

References